Acts 14 is the fourteenth chapter of the Acts of the Apostles in the New Testament of the Christian Bible. It records the first missionary journey of Paul and Barnabas to Phrygia and Lycaonia. The book containing this chapter is anonymous but early Christian tradition uniformly affirmed that Luke composed this book as well as the Gospel of Luke.

Text
The original text was written in Koine Greek. This chapter is divided into 28 verses.

Textual witnesses
Some early manuscripts containing the text of this chapter are:
In Greek
 Codex Vaticanus (AD 325–350)
 Codex Sinaiticus (330–360)
 Codex Bezae (~400)
 Codex Alexandrinus (400–440)
 Codex Ephraemi Rescriptus (~450)
 Codex Laudianus (~550; complete)
In Latin
 Codex Laudianus (~550; complete)
León palimpsest (7th century; extant verses 21–28)

Old Testament references
 : Psalm

Locations

This chapter mentions the following places (in order of appearance):
 Iconium, Phrygia
 Lystra and Derbe, cities of Lycaonia
 Antioch, Pisidia
 Perga, Pamphylia
 Attalia
 Antioch, Syria

Timeline 
The first missionary journey of Paul and Barnabas took place about AD 47–48.

Preaching in Iconium and Lystra (14:1–19)

Paul and his companions went out of Antioch in Pisidia to the east, apparently following the Roman road (Via Sebaste) which connects the Roman colonies of Antioch, Iconium (modern: Konya;  to the southeast) and Lystra (30 km further to the southwest) The account focuses less on the church foundation story, but more on the repeated opposition from "unbelieving Jews" or (in the aorist tense) "Jews who had decided against belief" in these cities.

Verse 11
 Now when the people saw what Paul had done, they raised their voices, saying in the Lycaonian language, "The gods have come down to us in the likeness of men!"
The Roman poet Ovid told of an ancient legend in which Zeus and Hermes came to the Phrygian hill country disguised as mortals seeking lodging. After being turned away from a thousand homes, they found refuge in the humble cottage of an elderly couple. In appreciation for the couple's hospitality, the gods transformed the cottage into a temple with a golden roof and marble columns. All the houses of the inhospitable people were then destroyed. This ancient legend may be the reason that the people treated Paul and Barnabas as gods. After witnessing the healing of the cripple, they did not want to make the same mistake as their ancestors. Ancient inscriptions confirm the existence of the local pre-Greek language ("Lycaonian") in that period, as well as the joint worship of Zeus and Hermes in the area.

Travel to Derbe (14:20)
But when the disciples gathered about him, he rose up and entered the city, and on the next day he went on with Barnabas to Derbe.

After Paul had been stoned and supposed dead in Lystra (verse 19), he and Barnabas departed the next day for Derbe (to the southeast of Lystra). Many translations render this text as 'and on the next day he went on with Barnabas to Derbe', implying they traveled within one day, but as it is about 60 miles from Lystra to the likely site of Derbe, Bastian van Elderen has stated that Acts 14:20 must be translated as 'on the next day he set out with Barnabas towards (or for) Derbe'.

Returning to Pisidia (14:21–23)
From Derbe, Paul and Barnabas began the journey back to Antioch, Pisidia, while consolidation of the newly planted churches along the way: 'strengthening the soul and encouraging believers to remain in the faith (verse 22) in person as Paul later does with his letters (cf. 1 Thessalonians 2:14—16; 3:2—4). The term
"Elders" (Greek:) is used by Paul as church officials in the Pastoral epistles (Titus 1:5; 1 Timothy 5:17,19), along with another term episkopoi (Acts 20:28; cf. Philippians 1:1).

The journey home from Pisidia to Syria (14:24–28)
This section records the conclusion of the journey, tracing the traversed region along the land road until reaching Attalia, where they sailed to Seleucia, the sea port of Antioch in Syria (verses 24–26). The missionary church received a 'formal report' on the accomplished work (verses 26–27), especially the opening of a 'door of faith' for the Gentiles (cf. 2 Corinthians 2:12).

See also 

 Antioch, Pisidia
 Antioch, Syria
 Attalia
 Barnabas
 Derbe, Lycaonia
 Hermes
 Iconium, Frygia
 Lystra, Lycaonia
 Perga, Pamphylia
 Paul the Apostle
 Timothy
 Zeus

 Other related Bible parts: Acts 13, 2 Timothy 3

References

Sources

External links
 King James Bible - Wikisource
English Translation with Parallel Latin Vulgate
Online Bible at GospelHall.org (ESV, KJV, Darby, American Standard Version, Bible in Basic English)
Multiple bible versions at Bible Gateway (NKJV, NIV, NRSV etc.)

14